The 2019 Tunis bombings occurred on 27 June 2019, when two suicide bombers detonated their explosives in two areas of Tunis, Tunisia, killing a police officer and wounding nine other people. Later in that day, the Islamic State of Iraq and the Levant claimed responsibility. The attack happened the same day Beji Caid Essebsi was taken to the hospital in critical condition for a serious health condition. The attack also happened the day after a four year anniversary of a mass shooting attack at two Sousse hotels.

Attack
The first suicide bombing happened near the French embassy on Charles de Gaulle street in Tunis. The attacker targeted a police patrol killing one officer and injuring four including another officer and three civilians. The second attack happened when the bomber blew up at a national guard base in al-Qarjani district of Tunis.

Responsibility
Many attacks happened in 2015 in Tunisia, including an attack at a tourist museum in Tunis in March, a tourist resort in June and an attack on a bus carrying presidential guards in November in Tunis. After 2015, major terror attacks by the Islamic State of Iraq and the Levant did not occur until October 2018, when a female lone wolf wounded 15 in a suicide bombing in Tunis.

Security measures
As a result of these attacks, on 5 July 2019, Tunisian Prime Minister Youssef Chahed has banned the wearing of the niqab – a full-face veil – in public institutions with immediate effect, citing security reasons. The decision, which was reported on state media, comes at a time of heightened security in the country. The attack was the third such incident within a week and came at the peak of tourist season as Tunisia prepared for an autumn parliamentary election.

References

2019 in Tunisia
2019 murders in Tunisia
2019 bombing
Terrorist incidents in Africa in 2019
Explosions in Tunisia
ISIL terrorist incidents in Tunisia
June 2019 crimes in Africa
June 2019 events in Africa
2019 bombing
Suicide bombings in Africa
2019 bombing
Terrorist incidents in Tunisia in the 2010s
Attacks in Tunisia
2019 disasters in Tunisia